Yorketown is a town and a locality in the Australian state of South Australia located in the southern Yorke Peninsula about  west of the state capital of Adelaide and about  south of the municipal seat of Maitland. At the 2016 census, the locality had a population of 969 of which 642 lived in its town centre.

History
Yorketown began as a private sub-division in section 85 of the cadastral unit of the Hundred of Melville in 1872. Its name was declared by the Surveyor General of South Australia as an official place name on 16 November 1995.
Boundaries were created for the locality which was given the "long established name" of Yorketown on 27 May 1999. The area associated with Yorketown is known as Garrdinya by the Narungga, the aboriginal people of the Yorke Peninsula.

Government 
It is located in the local government area of Yorke Peninsula Council, the state electoral district of Narungga and the federal Division of Grey.

Media 
The Southern Yorke's Peninsula Pioneer was first published in Yorketown on 21 January 1898, and sold at a discounted price due to its late appearance. It was originally owned and established by Ben L. Wilkinson, and later helped by his brother Richard. In Issue 10, on 25 March that year, the newspaper adopted a simpler title, The Pioneer, later becoming part of the Yorke Peninsula Country Times from June 1970.

For thirty years an opposition newspaper, The Southern Yorke's Peninsula Clarion (1 February – 31 May 1902), simplified to the Clarion (7 June 1902 – 21 May 1931), also existed in the town too.

References

External links

Yorke Peninsula website
Yorke Peninsula: Yorketown
Harvest Corner Website Yorke Peninsula Visitor Information Centre at Minlaton

Towns in South Australia
Yorke Peninsula